Miriam Beizana Vigo (born 20 August 1990) is a Spanish writer and literary critic.

She was born in A Coruña and works in administration in the industrial sector, and has been writing since she was very young. Her first novel, Marafariña., partly autobiographical, tells the love story of Ruth, a young Jehovah's Witness, and Olga, a Catalan girl who arrives newly to the village where Ruth resides; the sequel, Inflorescence,  was published three years later.  Todas las horas mueren (literally, All the hours die), is a short fiction novel based on a story begun by her mother. She has also written an essay about the pop singer Tino Casal.

Although her work often gives prominence to women (usually lesbians), she rejects the label of lesbian novels since her books are not exclusive to LGTBI people. In the words of the author:

Among her influences are Fannie Flagg, Virginia Woolf, Carmen Laforet, Rosa Montero and Ana María Matute.

She collaborates in literary criticism on A Librería website, and writes articles on the LGTB visibility and dissemination portal Hay una lesbiana en mi sopa (literally, There is a lesbian in my soup).

Awards and honours 
2nd Prize in the XI Intercultural Story Contest of Melilla (for the story El tren, literally, The train)
Finalist I Award Misteria 2018 by Les Editorial (for the story A Raíña, literally, The queen)

Works

Novels 
.

Essays

Stories

References 

Spanish feminist writers
Spanish lesbian writers
Spanish LGBT novelists
21st-century Spanish novelists
Critics of religions
Lesbian novelists
People from A Coruña
1990 births
Living people
21st-century Spanish women writers